Galium bifolium is a species of flowering plant in the coffee family known by the common names twinleaf bedstraw and low mountain bedstraw. It is native to western North America from British Columbia south to California and east to New Mexico, Colorado, South Dakota and Alberta. It grows in mountain forests and high-elevation plateaus.

Galium bifolium is an annual herb standing erect to a maximum height of about 15 centimeters. Leaves grow in whorls of four divided into two pairs. The foliage is hairless and sometimes slightly fleshy. The solitary flowers have three white tepals and the fruit is a round nutlet covered in shiny white hairs.

References

External links
USDA Plants Profile
Photo gallery

bifolium
Plants described in 1871
Flora of Alberta
Flora of British Columbia
Flora of the Cascade Range
Flora of Arizona
Flora of the Rocky Mountains
Flora of California
Flora of South Dakota
Flora of Oregon
Flora of Nevada
Flora of Utah
Flora of Idaho
Flora of Montana
Flora of New Mexico
Flora without expected TNC conservation status